PinBoys is a Danish pop punk/pop rock band that was formed in September 2002. The band consists of Jacob (vocalist/bass), Anne (vocalist), Simon (guitar) and Emil (drums). They released their first indie album Teenage Wasteland on March 15, 2007.

Biography

2002

Formed in Aarhus, Denmark in September 2002, the band recorded their first demo at Backyard Studios in October/November of the same year. They received great reviews for their first song entitled Quit it from Garageband.com and had their first contract to the New Yorker label Flytrap Records. Co-founder Sune was, however, replaced that same year on the guitar with current lead-guitarist Simon.

2003

2003 marked the band's first live performance on January 5. On August 14 their first EP entitled A-Side was released in Denmark, Brazil and USA, and the group embarked a 16 days tour in the United States. Co-founder and singer Ane leaves the band just before the first CD is released, and the newfound Stina leaves just after the tour finishes. Anne auditions for the band in December, and is chosen as second vocalist, making it the final line-up for the band.

2004

After signing with record company Flytrap Records in 2003, the band quickly breaks apart from the label due to dispute with line-up and musical taste. The band's second EP, No Control is recorded the same year, and speaks for itself. They ultimately signed an initial contract with Iceberg Records in December, with whom they remain up till now.

2005

Now touring through Germany, the band received great feedback and quickly became an insider throughout their tour. A new EP entitled Somewhere in Between is recorded in August of the year, and the band signs a management deal with Iceberg Records only.

2006

The band embarks yet another tour, accompanying artists such as Fall Out Boy and One Fine Day (band)  on their tour as special guest, and release their debut album Teenage Wasteland on March 15, 2007, that receives great reviews from fans.

2011

The band decided to split in 2010.
"After eight amazing years, we have decided to split up. We're still friends, but have different ideas about what to do and where to go musically. However, it's not all over. In the spring 2011 we will do a farewell-tour, where we will give you everything we've got! We'll keep you updated and about when, where and what will happen! Thank you for all the support. It's been a hell of a ride!

Watch our video here: PINBOYS SPLITTING UP - Farewell tour!

Love, Anne, Simon, Emil and Jakob"

Discography

EPs
 A-Side
 No Control
 Somewhere in Between

Albums
 Teenage Wasteland (2007)
 Simple Art (2009)

Notes

References

External links 
 "Soundvenue" Accessed 17.March 2010
 "Garageband" Accessed 17.March 2010

Danish musical groups